Feshi is a territory of the Democratic Republic of the Congo.  It is located in Kwango.

Subdivisions
The territory contains the following sectors:
Feshi Sector
Ganaketi Sector
Kobo Sector 
Mukoso Sector

References

Territories of Kwango Province